Calyx: A Journal of Art and Literature by Women is an American literary magazine published in Corvallis, Oregon. The journal was established in 1976 and by 2012 had published the work of some 4,000 female authors. The journal's publishing arm, CALYX Books, has published 40 titles to date. Calyx publishes poetry, creative nonfiction, fiction, art, and reviews.

Publication history

Calyx was the collective vision of four women in Corvallis, Oregon that attempts to discover emerging writers—including work by women of color, lesbian and bisexual women, young and old women.

Established in 1976, Calyx is a bi-annual publication.

Notable contributors 
 Barbara Kingsolver
 Julia Alvarez
 Natalie Goldberg
 Sharon Olds

Footnotes

External links 
 
 An Interview with Margarita Donnelly, Director of CALYX

Literary magazines published in the United States
Visual arts magazines published in the United States
Oregon culture
Magazines published in Oregon
Magazines established in 1976
Literature by women
1976 establishments in Oregon
Biannual magazines published in the United States
Women in Oregon